Hans-Dieter "Hansi" Flick (born 24 February 1965) is a German professional football coach and former player who is the manager of the Germany national team. From August 2006 to July 2014, he was the assistant coach of Germany under manager Joachim Löw. In August 2020, Flick won the UEFA Champions League as the manager of Bayern Munich, completing the club's second continental treble. In 2021, he also led the side to a FIFA Club World Cup and another Bundesliga title. Alongside Pep Guardiola, he is one of the only two managers to achieve a sextuple with their team. He took charge of the Germany national team in 2021, replacing Löw. Flick is regarded as one of the best managers in the world.

Playing career
As a player, he was a midfielder who played 104 matches for Bayern Munich and scored five goals between 1985 and 1990, where he won four Bundesliga titles as well as one DFB-Pokal title, and played in the 1987 European Cup Final. He later played 44 matches for Köln before retiring from professional football in 1993 due to injuries. His last spell as a footballer was with Victoria Bammental from 1994 until 2000.

He never played for the Germany national football team, but he made two appearances for the Germany under-18 team, in the group stage of the 1983 UEFA European Under-18 Championship on 15 and 17 May 1983, in a 1–0 win over Sweden and in a 3–1 win over Bulgaria, respectively.

Managerial career
Flick's managerial career began in 1996 as a player-manager of Viktoria Bammental, which was playing in the Oberliga Baden-Württemberg at that time. At the end of the 1998–99 season, the club was relegated to the Verbandsliga Baden, but Flick remained their coach for one more season.

1899 Hoffenheim
In July 2000, he became a manager of the Oberliga Baden-Württemberg side 1899 Hoffenheim, winning the league and gaining promotion to the Regionalliga Süd in his first season at the club. After four unsuccessful attempts to reach the 2. Bundesliga, he was released from duties on 19 November 2005.

Red Bull Salzburg (assistant)
Flick then worked briefly as an assistant of Giovanni Trapattoni and Lothar Matthäus and sporting coordinator at Red Bull Salzburg. Flick stated that his work under Trapattoni, one of the world's most renowned managers, taught him many things, especially on tactics and in developing relations with players, but also said that he disagreed with Trapattoni's defence-first approach.

Germany (assistant)

He was named the assistant coach for Germany on 23 August 2006. Although not listed as an officially recognized manager by the DFB, due to the sending off of Joachim Löw in the previous game, Flick was technically the German manager for the UEFA Euro 2008 quarter final against Portugal on 19 June 2008, which ended in a 3–2 win for Germany. After finishing second at the UEFA Euro 2008 and third at the 2010 FIFA World Cup, he reached the semi-finals at the UEFA Euro 2012 and won the 2014 FIFA World Cup as assistant coach of Germany. He became sporting director at the German Football Association after the 2014 World Cup until 16 January 2017.

Bayern Munich
On 1 July 2019, he joined Bayern Munich as an assistant coach, under the management of Niko Kovač. When Kovač left Bayern by mutual consent on 3 November 2019, Flick was promoted to the interim manager position. In his first match in charge, Bayern defeated Olympiacos 2–0 in the UEFA Champions League group stage on 6 November 2019. After a satisfying spell as interim coach, Bayern announced on 22 December 2019 that Flick would remain manager until the end of season.

In April 2020, Bayern Munich gave Flick a new contract lasting until 2023.

During the 2019–20 season, Flick successfully guided Bayern to win the Bundesliga, DFB-Pokal and UEFA Champions League, thus completing the continental treble for the second time in the club's history. He was subsequently named German Football Manager of the Year by sports magazine kicker, and also won the UEFA Men's Coach of the Year Award. The following season, he led Bayern to win the 2020 UEFA Super Cup against Sevilla. He also led Bayern to win its first ever sextuple after winning Club World Cup in February 2021 by defeating Mexican team Tigres.

On 17 April 2021, Flick announced that he had told the club he wanted to leave at the end of the season. He voiced his desire to coach the Germany national team, given his previous job as an assistant to present German team manager, Joachim Löw. Flick left Bayern with one of the greatest winning records in modern football history. During his tenure, Bayern lost just seven games and won seven trophies (Bundesliga twice, DFB-Pokal, Champions League, DFL-Supercup, UEFA Supercup, Club World Cup). Bayern went undefeated in the 2019–20 Champions League, the first team in European/Champions League history to lift the trophy with a 100 percent win record, and won 23 matches in a row across all competitions between 16 February 2020 and 18 September 2020, a record in German professional football. Flick also coached Bayern to a treble, the second treble in Bayern's history. Flick held one of the highest win rates in football history, winning 83% of his games and helped Bayern average 3.0 goals per game across all competitions. In October 2020, Flick won Europe's Coach of the Year, an award for the best coach in football in the major football leagues of Europe.

Germany

On 25 May 2021, the German Football Association announced that Flick signed a three-year contract from 1 August 2021 to serve as the manager of the Germany national team, and he replaced his former boss Joachim Löw after UEFA Euro 2020. On 2 September 2021, Flick won his first match 2–0 against Liechtenstein in a 2022 FIFA World Cup qualification match. On 4 June 2022, Germany drew 1–1 with Italy in the 2022–23 UEFA Nations League A; hence, he became the third coach to stay undefeated in his first ten matches, after Sepp Herberger and Josef Derwall. This run would end on 23 September, as Germany lost 1–0 to Hungary in the same competition.

In the 2022 FIFA World Cup, Germany was eliminated in the group stage for the second time in a row, as they finished third in their group, despite winning their final match 2–4 against Costa Rica. Flick received criticism for his substitutions, particularly against Japan in their tournament opener, which they lost 1–2.

Personal life
Flick is married to Silke Flick. As of 2020, they have been married for over 30 years. They have two children and two grandchildren.

Managerial statistics

Honours

Player
Bayern Munich
Bundesliga: 1985–86, 1986–87, 1988–89, 1989–90
DFB-Pokal: 1985–86
DFB-Supercup: 1987
European Cup runner-up: 1986–87

1. FC Köln
DFB-Pokal runner-up: 1990–91

Managerial
Germany (as assistant manager)
FIFA World Cup: 2014; third place: 2010
UEFA European Championship runner-up: 2008; third place: 2012

TSG 1899 Hoffenheim
Oberliga Baden-Württemberg: 2000–01

Bayern Munich
Bundesliga: 2019–20, 2020–21
DFB-Pokal: 2019–20
DFL-Supercup: 2020
UEFA Champions League: 2019–20
UEFA Super Cup: 2020
FIFA Club World Cup: 2020

Individual
UEFA Men's Coach of the Year: 2019–20
IFFHS World's Best Club Coach: 2020; third place 2021
World Soccer Men's Manager of the Year 2020
Globe Soccer Best Coach of the Year: 2020
German Football Manager of the Year: 2020
VDV Bundesliga Coach of the Season: 2019–20

References

External links

 

1965 births
Living people
Sportspeople from Heidelberg
Footballers from Baden-Württemberg
Association football midfielders
German footballers
West German footballers
Germany youth international footballers
SV Sandhausen players
FC Bayern Munich footballers
1. FC Köln players
Bundesliga players
Oberliga (football) players
German football managers
Association football coaches
Association football player-managers
TSG 1899 Hoffenheim managers
FC Bayern Munich non-playing staff
FC Bayern Munich managers
Germany national football team managers
Bundesliga managers
UEFA Champions League winning managers
German expatriate football managers
Expatriate football managers in Switzerland
German expatriate sportspeople in Switzerland
2022 FIFA World Cup managers